The Football League Third Division South Cup was a football knockout competition open to teams competing in Football League Third Division South. 

The competition was first held in 1933–34 and ran until the 1938–39 season. The cup was revived for the 1945–46 season.

Format
The competition was run using a knockout format, with games replayed if level. In the first year the tournament format resulted in 6 first round ties, with the remaining 10 sides joining in the next round to make eight ties. In most seasons there were minor changes to the format, resulting in differing numbers of ties in each round. The tournaments featured all 22 teams from Division Three South. In the first two seasons the final was played at a neutral venue, and for the next three seasons the final was two-legged, whilst the final edition was not completed.

The 1945–46 competition started with two cup competitions, the Third Division South (South) Cup and Third Division South (North) Cup. Each cup consisted of 11 teams played on a league basis, although only 16 games were played by each team. The first two places in each cup then contested the semi-finals of a knockout competition.

Finals

Source:

Venues
The 1933–34 final was held at Home Park, Plymouth on 2 May 1934.

The 1945–46 final was held at Stamford Bridge, London.

See also
Football League Third Division North Cup
Football League Trophy

References

Defunct football cup competitions in England
Defunct English Football League competitions
cup